G. K. Hall & Co. is an American book publisher based in Boston. It was founded sometime in the late 1950s by Garrison Kent Hall (1917–1973), who also had been an accountant.  The firm initially, in the late 1950s through the 1960s, produced catalogs, in print and microform, of collections of renowned libraries notably the New York Public Library. In the 1960s, Betty Jensen Hall’s new marketing strategy increased profits markedly and the firm expanded, producing other library references in the sciences, humanities, fine arts, and music. Beginning in 1971, two years after being acquired by ITT, the firm became a leading pioneer of publishing large-print editions of best-selling fiction and non-fiction books. In 1972 it acquired Gregg Press the scholarly reprint company. In 1973 it acquired Twayne Publishers. In 1989 it acquired Sandak, the art slide publisher. In 1990 it acquired Thorndike Press, its main American large print competitor.

Succession of ownership 
G. K. Hall was founded sometime in the 1950s and was incorporated in Massachusetts in December 1962. The company was acquired by ITT in September 1969 and sold to Macmillan Publishing in 1985. In 1990, Macmillan was acquired by Robert Maxwell, and in 1991 its order processing and shipping functions were moved to Riverside, N.J., its editorial and marketing functions distributed to other divisions, and its Boston office was closed. In 1999, G. K. Hall became an imprint of Thomson Gale when Gale acquired its parent, Macmillan Reference USA.

Selected library references 

 Bibliographic Guide to Theatre Arts (1976)
 Catalog of the Theatre and drama collections, 1967–1989; 

 Compiled volumes

 Vols. 1–4: A–Cat; 
 Vols. 5-8: Cas–GA; 
 Vols. 17–20: New–Sau; 
 Vols. 21–24: Sav–US; 
 Vols. 25–28: US-Z; 

 Loose compiled volumes

 Vol. 1–21; 

 Single volumes

 Vol. 1: A–M; 
 Vol. 2: An–Ba; 
 Vol. 3: Be–Brov; 
 Vol. 4: Brow–Car; 
 Vol. 5: Cas–Colt; 
 Vol. 6: Colu–Dec; 
 Vol. 7: Ded–E; 
 Vol. 8: F–Ga; 
 Vol. 9: Ge–Hall; 
 Vol. 10: Halo–Inc; 
 Vol. 11: Ind–Indians; 
 Vol. 12: Indians–J; 
 Vol. 13: K–Linc; 
 Vol. 14: Lind–Mass; 
 Vol. 15: Mast–Mol; 
 Vol. 16: Mom–Nev; 
 Vol. 17: New–O; 
 Vol. 18: P–Pin; 
 Vol. 19: Pio–Reu; 
 Vol. 20: Rev–Sau; 
 Vol. 21: Sav–Sous; 
 Vol. 22: Sout–Teh; 
 Vol. 23: Tei–US, C; 
 Vol. 24: US, D–US, History; 
 Vol. 25: US, History–US, Hy; 
 Vol. 26: US–Vat; 
 Vol. 27: Vau–Wer; 
 Vol. 28: Wes–Z; 
 1st Supplement (1973); 
 Vol. 1: A–E Brown; 
 Vol. 2: F Brown-Deu; 
 Vol. 3: Dev–Her; 
 Vol. 4: Hes–Lek; 
 Vol. 5: Lel–Nev; 
 Vol. 6: New–Roc; 
 Vol. 7: Rod-US Delaware; 
 Vol. 8: US Dem–US Rur; 
 Vol. 9: US San–Z; 

 Contemporary American Composers, compiled by E. Ruth Anderson (1907–1989), G.K. Hall & Co.
 1st ed. (1976); 
 2nd ed. (1982);

Selected book series
 The Asian Literature Bibliography Series  
 Bibliographies of New England History 
 Critical Essays on American Literature
 Critical Essays on British Literature  
 G. K. Hall Large Print Book Series  
 G. K Hall Large Print Inspirational Collection     
 G.K. Hall Large Print Science Fiction Series     
 G. K. Hall Nightingale Series Edition
 G. K. Hall's Agatha Christie Series
 The Gregg Press Science Fiction Series
 Masters of Science Fiction and Fantasy  
 Portway Large Print Series
 Professional Librarian Series 
 Research Bibliographies in American Literature
 Reference Guides to Literature   
 A Reference Publication in Film 
 Thorndike Press Large Print Paperback Series
 Twayne's English Authors Series
 Twayne's Music Series
 Twayne's United States Authors Series
 Twayne's World Authors Series
 World Bibliographical Series
 World Cities Series

Former executives 
 Garrison Kent Hall (1917–1973), founder
 Betty Jensen Hall (1929-2009), co-owner and VP, comptroller (1960-1971)
 Phillips A. Treleaven (1928–2000), President of G. K. Hall (1970-1978)
 Thomas T. Beeler (1944-), Editor, Gregg Press and Twayne Publishers imprints (1972-1974); Editorial Director, General Publishing (1974-1978); President of G.K. Hall (1978–1991)
 James Diamond, President of G. K. Hall (1991-1993)
 Remo Alphonso Caroselli (1922–1968), Vice President
 Thomas M. Finn, ThD (1924–1999), Editor-in-Chief; later, academic dean at the College of William and Mary
 Elizabeth Buckley Kubik (1938–), Editor, Editor-in-Chief (1968?-1991)
 John F. Curley Sr. (1928–2001), Marketing Director (1970-1977)

References

External links 
G. K. Hall alumni site (blog)

Book publishing companies of the United States
Book publishing companies based in Massachusetts